

Basketball

See also
Southeast Asia Basketball Association
Basketball at the Asian Games
FIBA Asia Championship

 
West Asian Games
West Asian Games
West Asian Games